Homenaje a Dos Leyendas (Spanish for "Homage to Two Legends") is the collective name of a series of annual lucha libre, or professional wrestling major show promoted by Mexican professional wrestling promotion Consejo Mundial de Lucha Libre (CMLL). The show started out as Homenaje a Salvador Lutteroth, honoring CMLL founder Salvador Lutteroth, it would later honor Lutteroth and El Santo until 2005 where the event would honor Lutteroth and a different retired or deceased luchador each year. CMLL has held a total of 23 Homenaje events, starting in 1996 and one each year since then. The shows are usually main evented by a Lucha de Apuestas or "Bet match" where competitors wager either their wrestling mask or hair on the outcome of the match.

Event history
CMLL has paid homage to its founder Salvador Lutteroth since Lutteroth's death in 1987 but it was not until 1995 that they held a specific event in his honor. On March 24, 1995, during their regular Friday night CMLL Super Viernes show they held a one night Trios tournament called the Salvador Lutteroth Trios Tournament. The following year CMLL decided to hold a special major event in March to commemorate Lutteroth, creating a show called Homenaje a Salvador Lutteroth ("Homage to Salvador Lutteroth"). in 1995, 1996 and 1999 the event hosted a one-night tournament in Lutteroth's name. The Lutteroth memorial tournament concept has not been used since then. In 1999 CMLL decided to also honor Mexico's most famous wrestler El Santo at the same event, changing the name of the event to Homenaje a Dos Leyendas: El Santo y Salvador Lutteroth ("Homage to Two Legends: El Santo and Salvador Lutteroth"). After a dispute with El Santo's son El Hijo del Santo in late 2004/early 2005 CMLL decided to change the show name to simply Homenaje a Dos Leyendas and honor Lutteroth and a different "lucha libre legend" each year. The 2005 event honored Perro Aguayo, who returned to the wrestling ring for one last match on that night, teaming up with his son Perro Aguayo Jr. CMLL has on occasion promoted the March event under a different name as well as the Homenaje name, in 2000 and in 2001 they also billed their March shows as Juicio Final ("Final Justice") and in 2002 it was also billed as Apocalipsis ("Apocalypse").

As of 2015 a total of 156 wrestlers had wrestled in a total of matches 120 matches over the 20 shows, 14 female wrestlers, 17 Mini-Estrellas and 148 male wrestlers from the regular division. Atlantis and Negro Casas are the wrestlers with the most Homenaje a Dos Leyendas matches, 15 each,
Marcela is the female wrestler with most matches, six, and Pierrothito is the most frequently featured Mini-Estrella with three matches in total. Several wrestlers has worked on different Dos Leyendas shows under different ring names; Ephesto / Safari, Metro / Diamante Azul, Místico / Astro Boy, Silver King / Black Tiger III, Ultramán Jr. / Starman, Tarzan Boy / Toscano and Villano V / Ray Mendoza Jr. All of the twenty shows have featured a Lucha de Apuestas, or bet match as the main event. The match type is the most prestigious match form in lucha libre as illustrated by its main event status. In total seven wrestlers have lost their masks as a result of a Luchas de Apuesta loss; Scorpio Jr., Villano III, Villano V, Veneno, El Felino, Namajague and Kamaitachi. Twenty one times a wrestler has had their hair shaved off as a result of their Dos Leyendas matches; El Brazo, La Fiera, Bestia Salvaje, El Satánico, Perro Aguayo, Gran Markus Jr., Máscara Año 2000 (twice), Cien Caras (twice), Universo 2000 (twice), Héctor Garza, Brazo de Plata, Máximo, Negro Casas, Blue Panther, La Amapola, Shigeo Okumura, Dalys la Caribeña, Shocker, El Terrible and Rey Bucanero The Dos Leyendas show series has hosted seven championship matches, with five championship changes and two successful defenses. There have been a total of five tournament finals held at a Dos Leyendas show, including a tournament for the vacant CMLL World Trios Championship, the Lutteroth singles and Trios tournament and the finals of the 2012 Torneo Nacional de Parejas Increibles 2014 Torneo Nacional de Parejas Increibles tournaments.

Dates, venues, and main events

Footnotes

References

Recurring events established in 1996